The Women's Professional Soccer Player Allocation distributed 21 players from the United States women's national soccer team player pool to seven teams in the Women's Professional Soccer (WPS) for the league's inaugural season.

Process
The allocation followed a process in which the players and teams submitted their preferences to the league. A committee then reviewed the lists to provide its recommendations. The WPS Board of Governors met on September 14–15, 2008 to consult with the players, teams and league to determine the best possible dispersal for all parties with the following allocation results.

Allocation results

References

Allocation
Women's Professional Soccer drafts
Association football player non-biographical articles